Xenonemesia is a genus of spiders in the family Microstigmatidae. It was first described in 1989 by Goloboff. , it contains 3 South American species.

References

Microstigmatidae
Mygalomorphae genera
Spiders of South America